The 85th Regiment of Foot (Westminster Volunteers) was a short-lived infantry Regiment in the British Army which was raised in 1777 to provide garrison troops for the West Indies during the American Revolutionary War.

It was posted to Jamaica, where its numbers were ravaged by endemic diseases such as Yellow Fever. Many of survivors then perished in a storm off Newfoundland on their way home aboard the captured ship Ville de Paris in 1782. The remnants of the regiment were disbanded at Dover in 1783.

The Colonels of the Regiment were:  
1778–1783: Gen. Charles Stanhope, 3rd Earl of Harrington, GCH 
1783: Lt-Col. Lord Henry FitzGerald

References

Infantry regiments of the British Army
Military units and formations established in 1777
Military units and formations disestablished in 1783
1777 establishments in England